Gonbaki District is a district (bakhsh) in Rigan County, Kerman Province, Iran.  At the 2006 census, its population was 11,926, in 2,554 families.  The district has one city: Mohammadabad-e Gonbaki. The district has one rural district (dehestan): Gonbaki Rural District.

References 

Rigan County
Districts of Kerman Province